Christine Johnson may refer to:
Christine Johnson (Utah politician) (born 1968), member of the Utah House of Representatives
Christine Johnson (actress) (1911–2010), actress and vocalist of the 1940s
Christine J. Johnson (born 1953), member of the Illinois Senate

See also
Christine Jönsson (born 1958), Swedish politician
Kristine Johnson (born 1972), American newscaster
Kristina M. Johnson (born 1957), American engineer, executive and academic administrator
Christina Johnston, English coloratura soprano
Chris Johnson (disambiguation)